Sembiapalayam is a panchayat village in Nettapakkam Commune in the Union Territory of Puducherry, India.

Geography
Sembiampalayam is bordered by Embalam in the west, Sathamangalam in the north,  Korkadu in the east and Chellancherry village (Tamil nadu) in the south.

Transport
Sembiampalayam is located at 13 km. from Pondicherry. Sembiapalayam can be reached directly by any bus running between Pondicherry and Maducarai running via Mangalam.

Road Network
Sembiampalayam is connected to Pondicherry by Mangalam-Maducarai State Highway (RC-19). Also Kizhur Road (RC-30) starts from Sembiampalayam.

Politics
Sembiampalayam is a part of Embalam (Union Territory Assembly constituency) which comes under Puducherry (Lok Sabha constituency)

References

External links
 Official website of the Government of the Union Territory of Puducherry

Villages in Puducherry district